Concerning the Entrance into Eternity is the first collaborative album by Jozef van Wissem and Jim Jarmusch. It was released on Important Records in 2012.

A music video was created for the track "The Sun of the Natural World Is Pure Fire." It was directed by Diego Barrera.

Reception
Marc Masters of Pitchfork Media gave the album a 7.3 out of 10, describing it as "the first full release Van Wissem has made with an actual punk rocker."

Track listing

References

External links
 

Minimal music albums
2012 albums
Important Records albums